Old Malda Junction railway station is a junction railway station in Malda district, West Bengal. Its code is OMLF. It serves Malda. The station consists of three platforms. The platforms are not well sheltered. It lacks many facilities including water and sanitation.

Major trains

Some of the important trains that runs from Malda are :

New Jalpaiguri -Malda Town Express
 Balurghat–Malda Town Passenger (unreserved)
 Gour Express (Balurghat–Sealdah)
 Balurghat Malda Town Passenger (unreserved)
 Katihar–Malda Town Passenger (unreserved)
 Malda Court–Siliguri Jn DMU
 Malda Town New Jalpaiguri Passenger (unreserved)
 Singhabad Old Malda Passenger (unreserved)

References

Railway stations in Malda district
Katihar railway division
Railway junction stations in West Bengal
Maldah
Transport in Maldah